Benešov nad Černou (until 1948 Německý Benešov) is a municipality and village in Český Krumlov District in the South Bohemian Region of the Czech Republic. It has about 1,400 inhabitants. The centre of Benešov nad Černou is well preserved and is protected by law as an urban monument zone.

Administrative parts
Villages of Černé Údolí, Daleké Popelice, Děkanské Skaliny, Dluhoště, Hartunkov, Klení, Kuří, Ličov, Pusté Skaliny, Valtéřov, Velké Skaliny and Velký Jindřichov are administrative parts of Benešov nad Černou.

Geography
It lies on the border of the Gratzen Mountains and Gratzen Foothills.

Benešov nad Černou lies on the small river Černá. There are several fish ponds in the municipal territory, the largest of them is Velký Klenský.

History

The first written mention of Benešov is from 1332. It was founded in the second half of the 13th century as a settlement by a fortress. It was named after its founder, the nobleman Beneš of Michalovice. In 1383, Benešov was promoted to a market town. In 1387, it was purchased by Oldřich I of Rosenberg and joined to Nové Hrady estate.

As a result of frequent fires (in 1617, 1801, 1849, 1863 and 1891), the medieval character of Benešov was destroyed. In 1881, Benešov became a town and its name changed to Německý Benešov ("German Benešov"). After the World War II, the German population was expelled and the town depopulated. In 1946, the name changed to Benešov nad Černou after the local watercourse Černá. In 1950, the municipality lost its town status.

Sights
The main landmarks are the town hall from 1594 and the Church of Saint James the Great, which was originally built in the Gothic style in 1332 and rebuilt to its current form in 1630. Other sights on the square are a Baroque fountain and a statue of St. John of Nepomuk from 1726.

References

External links

Villages in Český Krumlov District